Baluse or Baloese is a traditional shield of the Nias people originating from Nias, an island off the west coast of North Sumatra, Indonesia. Baluse in the Northern Nias is somewhat smaller than those of the rest of the island.

Description 
The shield is made of wood shaped like banana leaves and is held on the left hand which serves to deflect enemy attacks. The surface of the shield is carved with rib-cage patterns from top to bottom. There is a round knob at the centre of the shield, and the shield's handle is directly behind this knob.

Culture 
The Baluse is used with the Balato (sword) or the Burusa (spear) during traditional war dances such as Faluaya (or Fataele) and Maena Baluse.

See also

Klebit Bok
Kanta (shield)

References

Further reading 
 Joachim Freiherr von Brenner-Felsach, Eine Reise nach Nias: unveröffentlichte Manuskripte aus dem Museum für Völkerkunde in Wien : Materialien zu Exotismus und Ethnographie, Böhlau Verlag Wien, 1998, 

Shields
Weapons of Indonesia